Maud Hogarth Yardley (6 March 1867 – 1 May 1954) was a British writer.

Personal life 
Maud H. Croft (or Mannering) was born in London in 1867, the daughter of Montague Mannering and Esther Croft. She married British writer, drama critic and former cricketer William Yardley, in New York in 1886, and they had four children. She was widowed when William Yardley died in 1900, and she died in 1954, aged 87 years, in Evesham, Worcestershire.

Career 
Yardley was a widow with young children when she became a published author. Her first novel, Sinless (1906), was described as a "foggy romance" of mistaken identities. It was followed with an "engrossing" and "tragic" novel, Nor All Your Tears (1908). She also wrote short stories for newspapers and magazines.

Books by Maud H. Yardley 

 Sinless (1906)
 Nor All Your Tears (1908)
 To-day and Love (1910)
 At the Door of the Heart (1913)
 Love's Debt (1913)
 For You (1913)
 Because (1913)
 The Willoughbys (1914)
 A Man's Life is Different, or The Sleeping Flame (1914)
 Dare's Halliday Wooing (1915)
 Soulmates (1917)
 Mrs. John (1919)
 Ordered to Marry! (1921)

References

External links 

 Scott, "British & Irish Women Writers of Fiction 1910-1960 (Wh - Z)" Furrowed Middlebrow (January 1, 2013), a blog post including an entry on Yardley.

1867 births
1954 deaths
19th-century English novelists
English women novelists
20th-century English novelists
Writers from London
Writers from Worcestershire
People from Evesham
20th-century English women
20th-century English people
19th-century English women